Agrippa was a Greek astronomer.  The only thing that is known about him regards an astronomical observation that he made in 92 AD. Ptolemy writes that in the twelfth year of the reign of Domitian, on the seventh day of the Bithynian month Metrous, Agrippa observed the occultation of a part of the Pleiades by the southernmost part of the Moon.

The purpose of Agrippa's observation was probably to check the precession of the equinoxes, which was discovered by Hipparchus.

The lunar crater Agrippa is named after him.

References

External links
Agrippa

Ancient Greek astronomers
1st-century Greek people
1st-century births
1st-century deaths
1st-century astronomers